Uttoron Padak (Bengali: উত্তরণ পদক) is a military medal of Bangladesh. The medal is intended to reward servicemen who took part in the campaign in the Chittagong Hill Tracts. The “Operation Dabanal” (Operation Wildfire) was re-established in the name of “Operation Uttoron” (Operation Upliftment) by which the Bangladesh military want to solve the CHT crisis militarily through imposing military maneuvers superseding the local civil administration.

References 

Military awards and decorations of Bangladesh